Daniel William Bigel is an American film producer (CEO and founder of Bigel Entertainment) who has produced several films including Loverboy directed by and starring Kevin Bacon and Kyra Sedgwick, Empire starring John Leguizamo and Peter Sarsgaard, Two Girls and a Guy and Harvard Man, written and directed by James Toback, which starred, in his first major film production, Adrian Grenier of Entourage fame.

Bigel also co-founded Broadway South, LLC, a company dedicated to rebuilding downtown New Orleans through the creation of a "live entertainment" theater district along Canal Street.

Filmography
He was a producer in all films unless otherwise noted.

Film

References

External links

Bigel, Daniel William
Living people
1965 births